Bikini Island is a 1991 American crime thriller film directed by Tony Markes and starring Holly Floria and Alicia Anne. It has been cited as an "erotic thriller".

Plot

James M. Craddock describes the plot as "Beautiful swimsuit models gather on a remote tropical island for a big photo shoot, each vying to be the next cover girl of the hottest swimsuit magazine. Before long, scantily clad lovelies are turning up dead."

Cast
Holly Floria as Annie
Alicia Anne as Ursula
Jackson Robinson as Jack Denton
Kelly Poole as Brian Michael
Sherry Johnson as Anesa Cronin
Gaston LeGaf as Pat
Shannon Stiles as Nikki
Kathleen McOsker as Tasha
Terry Miller as Frab
B. Lee Drew as Leon DeLodge 
Cyndi Pass as Kari
Jim E. Jae as Photographer on Cliff
Dean Georgopoulos as Producer on Cliff
Laura Lang as Stylist on Cliff
Rachel Kligerman as Assistant on Cliff

Production
During filming in Malibu, Stuntman Jay C. Currin was killed the first day of filming when a stunt-fall off a 55-foot cliff went wrong and he landed on some rocks instead of the airbag that had been placed to break his fall.

References

External links 
 

American crime thriller films
1991 films
1991 crime thriller films
American erotic thriller films
Films set on islands
1990s English-language films
1990s American films